Brian W. Jones (born August 9, 1968) is an American politician serving in the California State Senate. A Republican, he represents the 38th State Senate district, encompassing most of inland San Diego County. He previously served in the California State Assembly, representing the 71st district, also encompassing most of inland San Diego County. Prior to being elected to the state assembly, he was a member of the Santee City Council.

Early life and education 
Born in Austin, Texas, Jones moved to California in 1978. Jones graduated from Santana High School and continued his education at Grossmont College before earning a bachelor's degree in business administration from San Diego State University in 1991.

Career 
Prior to entering politics, he served as Commissioner of the Mobile Home Fair Practices Commission, President of the Kiwanis Key Club, and Secretary of San Diego 4-Wheelers, and a member of the Santee Parks and Recreation Committee. Professionally, Jones was a manager at Domino's Pizza and a real estate broker.

Santee City Council 
Jones was elected to the Santee City Council in November 2002. While on the City Council, he served as a representative on the Mission Trails Regional Park Task Force, Heartland Fire Training Authority Commission, the Santee Elementary School District Conference Committee, the Santee Library Committee, the Goodan Ranch Policy Committee, and as an alternate representative on the Metropolitan Transit Services Board. In addition, he also served on the board of directors for the East County Boys & Girls Club.

As a member of the Santee City Council, Jones oversaw the planning and approval of the Santee Town Center Park and YMCA Aquatic Center.

California State Assembly 
Jones was elected to the California State Assembly in 2010, as a representative of the 77th Assembly District, located in East San Diego County, California. He campaigned on a number of conservative issues, including private sector job creation, which he stated includes "getting government out of the way of the free enterprise market—lower taxes on individuals and corporations, and two, reducing the regulatory burden that the state government is placing on businesses that is chasing them out of the state."

As a member of the Assembly, Jones has expressed support for the Second Amendment, opposition to illegal immigration, and a desire to see reforms aimed at curtailing the influence of public-sector labor unions. His signature piece of legislation, AB 860, would "prohibit direct political contributions by corporations and unions to political candidates" and "prohibit government employers to deduct from government worker paychecks money that is then used to engage in political activity." In 2016, Jones voted against California SB 1322, a bill that would place any minors forced into prostitution into protective custody instead of charging them with prostitution. This bill would also make it illegal to record someone in a partial or complete state of undress without their knowledge or consent, and added an additional punishment of up to a $10,000 fine for individuals who knowingly solicited sex from minors. He testified before the State Board of Equalization in opposition to the proposed State Responsibility Fire Fee, and has been a supporter of the Stop Special Interest Money initiative and an effort to repeal the California DREAM Act.

In 2011, Governor Jerry Brown signed Jones’ bill, AB 959, into law. The new law will "streamline the CalWORKs process for recipients and counties throughout California."

Committee assignments 
 Vice Chair, Business, Professions, & Consumer Protection
 Governmental Organization
 Utilities & Commerce
 Assembly Legislative Ethics

Legislative scorecards 
California Republican Assembly – 88%
Howard Jarvis Taxpayers Association – 93.8%
Capitol Resource Family Impact – 100%
American Conservative Union – 96%

ALEC 
Jones is one of the few members of the California legislature to make his association with the conservative American Legislative Exchange Council public. Jones is the only member of the California state legislature listed as an attendee of ALEC's Convention of States Simulation in September 2016.

Personal life 
Jones lives in Santee, California, with his wife Heather and their three children.

Elections

2014 California State Assembly

References

External links 
 
 Campaign website
 Join California Brian W. Jones
 

1968 births
California city council members
Living people
Republican Party California state senators
Republican Party members of the California State Assembly
Politicians from Austin, Texas
People from Santee, California
San Diego State University alumni
21st-century American politicians
Candidates in the 2020 United States elections
Appropriations Committee member, California State Senate